MacIntyre School is a mixed Independent school for children with learning disabilities and/or autism. It is situated in the village of Wingrave near Aylesbury, Buckinghamshire.

The school provides residential and day placements.

External links
 https://www.macintyrecharity.org/for-children/macintyre-school/ - official School website
 Residential Support: https://www.macintyrecharity.org/for-children/macintyre-school/residential-provision/ - Official website
https://www.macintyrecharity.org/files/43769e2d24f985711fd4aaaaebc003a3.pdf - Ofsted Inspection, MacIntyre School 2020

Special schools in Buckinghamshire
Private schools in Buckinghamshire